John McMillan (15 December 1938 – 20 April 2017) was  a former Australian rules footballer who played with St Kilda in the Victorian Football League (VFL).

Notes

External links 		
		
		
		
		
		
				
1938 births
2017 deaths
Australian rules footballers from Victoria (Australia)		
St Kilda Football Club players
Hamilton Imperials Football Club players